Hoofs and Goofs is a 1957 short subject directed by Jules White starring American slapstick comedy team The Three Stooges (Moe Howard, Larry Fine and Joe Besser in his first starring role with the act.). It is the 175th entry in the series released by Columbia Pictures starring the comedians, who released 190 shorts for the studio between 1934 and 1959.

Plot
Joe cannot stop thinking of his late sister, Birdie. Moe and Larry humour him by making him think that Birdie will meet them the following day downtown, in some form. When the boys trek downtown, they meet up with a horse that turns out to be Birdie reincarnated, much to Moe and Larry's surprise.

The boys are ecstatic, and try to persuade their horsie sister to return home with them. At first, she resists, but eventually gives in. No sooner do the boys get Birdie home that they discover she is pregnant. Joe goes berserk and demands Moe and Larry prepare for the arrival of the newborn. In the interim, Birdie's heavy hoofs can be clearly heard by the landlord Mr. Dinklespiel (Benny Rubin) and his daughter (Harriette Tarler) living downstairs. Dinklespiel marches upstairs and demands that the Stooges come clean, but Moe tries to convince him that the sounds are nothing more than the trio.

Once Dinklespiel leaves, Birdie gives birth to a baby colt. Joe is so taken by the moment, he happily declares "I'm an uncle, I'm an uncle!" Within seconds, Joe is awoken by Moe and Larry, who hear his cries of being an uncle. It turns out that the whole thing was a dream, and sister Birdie (Moe in drag) is alive and well and living with the Stooges. When Joe tells Birdie he had a dream that she was a horse, she takes offense, and promptly places a casserole on Joe's bald dome.

Cast

Credited
 Moe Howard as Moe/Birdie
 Harold Breen as Moe (seen from back)
 Larry Fine as Larry
 Joe Besser as Joe (first starring role)
 Harriette Tarler as Dinklespiel's daughter
 Benny Rubin as Mr. Dinklespiel
 Tony the Wonder Horse as Birdie (reincarnated)

Uncredited
 Ruth Godfrey White as Birdie (voice)
 Joe Palma as drunk man

Production notes
Hoofs and Goofs was the first Three Stooges short featuring Joe Besser as the third Stooge; filming was completed April 18–20, 1956. According to Besser's autobiography Not Just a Stooge, Besser spoke to Moe shortly before filming to convey his condolences over the death of Shemp Howard the year before. Joe and Shemp had been good friends.

The film's original ending was to have the Stooges' sister, Birdie, hit Joe with a rolling pin. However, due to his not wanting to be hit in the head with a solid prop, it was changed to a casserole.

The film makes reference to actress Kim Novak, when spoken by the reincarnated Birdie.

See also
 List of American films of 1957

References

External links
 
 
Hoofs and Goofs at threestooges.net

1957 films
1957 comedy films
The Three Stooges films
American black-and-white films
Films about horses
Films directed by Jules White
Columbia Pictures short films
1950s English-language films
1950s American films